Albert Chukwuemeka Okwuegbunam (born April 25, 1998) is an American football tight end for the Denver Broncos of the National Football League (NFL). He played college football at Missouri.

Early life
Okwuegbunam attended Sacred Heart-Griffin High School in Springfield, Illinois. He played wide receiver for the football team. He committed to the University of Missouri to play college football.

College career
After redshirting his first year at Missouri in 2016, Okwuegbunam played in all 13 games in 2017 and recorded 29 receptions for 415 yards and 11 touchdowns. He returned as Missouri's starter in 2018. Following the 2019 season, Okwuegbunam decided to forgo his final year of eligibility and declared for the 2020 NFL Draft.

Professional career

Okwuegbunam was selected by the Denver Broncos in the fourth round with the 118th overall pick in the 2020 NFL draft, reuniting with his former Missouri teammate, Drew Lock. He made his NFL debut in Week 6 of the 2020 season against the New England Patriots. He had two receptions for 45 yards in the 18–12 victory. He was placed on injured reserve on November 10, 2020 with a torn ACL.

On October 9, 2021, Okwuegbunam was placed on injured reserve with a hamstring injury. He was activated on October 30.

References

External links
Denver Broncos bio
Missouri Tigers bio

1998 births
Living people
American sportspeople of Nigerian descent
Sportspeople from Springfield, Illinois
Players of American football from Illinois
American football tight ends
Missouri Tigers football players
Denver Broncos players